Bolitoglossa orestes, commonly known as the Culata mushroomtongue salamander, is a species of salamander in the family Plethodontidae. It is endemic to the Mérida state of Venezuela.

Taxonomy
Bolitoglossa spongai (common name: Sponga salamander), described in 1999, is since 2012 considered a synonym of Bolitoglossa orestes.

Description
Adult Bolitoglossa orestes measure  in snout–vent length. Males and females are alike. Their skin is smooth and brown-orange to pale brown or yellowish in colour in the dorsum but darker in the flanks. The tail is about as long as the snout–vent length. Breeding is by direct development.

Habitat and conservation
This uncommon species is only found in cloud forests at the elevations of  asl. Some populations might be threatened by habitat loss, but many populations are within protected areas.

References

Bolitoglossa
Amphibians of Venezuela
Endemic fauna of Venezuela
Taxa named by David B. Wake
Amphibians described in 1962
Taxonomy articles created by Polbot